is a 1984 Japanese computer-animated surreal short film produced by Takashi Fukumoto at Toyo Links and Hitoshi Nishimura at Osaka University. It's notable for its early use of primitive motion capture, using profile and head-on films of a tiger walking (a la Muybridge).

Crew
 Producer: Takashi Fukumoto (Toyo Links), Hitoshi Nishimura (Osaka University)
 Digitizers: Hiroyuki Hayashi, Masuharu Endo, Taku Kimura, Noriaki Murashima, Chiharu Kajitsuka, Shinji Tanaka, Hiroshi Yoshimura, Koji Ichihashi

Special thanks

Osaka University
 Koichi Omura
 Isao Shirakawa
 Makoto Hirai
 Masato Nishida
 Takashi Yamana
 Nariyoshi Yamai
 Hirohisa Wakai

Nippon Electronics College
 Yoichiro Kawaguchi
 Suma Noji
 Yuzuru Nakamura

French parody
Sio-Benbor is a 1988 French parody of Bio-Sensor, created by a French company, Fantôme. It's notable for having a “really cute kitty” cat.

References

External links
 
 

1984 films
1984 anime films
1984 short films
1984 computer-animated films
Japanese short films
Japanese computer-animated films
Films using motion capture
1980s Japanese films